Le Mont-Dore is a commune in the suburbs of Nouméa in the South Province of New Caledonia, an overseas territory of France in the Pacific Ocean.

Geography

Climate

Le Mont-Dore has a tropical monsoon climate (Köppen climate classification Am).

Population

Twin towns – sister cities

Le Mont-Dore is twinned with:

 Arue, French Polynesia
 Bélep, New Caledonia
 Luganville, Vanuatu
 Nuku-Hiva, French Polynesia
 Pouébo, New Caledonia
 Sunshine Coast, Australia
 Yogyakarta, Indonesia

Notable people
 Réginald Bernut, a local politician
 Ilaïsaane Lauouvéa, former member of congress

References

External sites

Communes of New Caledonia